The Benton County Jail is a historic county jail building at 212 North Main Street in Bentonville, Arkansas, United States. It is a two-story brick Classical Revival building, designed by A. O. Clark and completed in 1911.  It has pronounced limestone corner quoining, and its main entrance is flanked by Ionic columns and topped by a gabled pediment. The building is notable as a rare smaller-scale work by Clark.

The building was listed on the National Register of Historic Places in 1988.

See also
National Register of Historic Places listings in Benton County, Arkansas

References

Government buildings completed in 1911
Jails on the National Register of Historic Places in Arkansas
National Register of Historic Places in Bentonville, Arkansas
1911 establishments in Arkansas
Neoclassical architecture in Arkansas